Ani DiFranco is the debut album of the singer-songwriter Ani DiFranco, released in 1990.

Track listing 
All songs by Ani DiFranco.

 Side A
 "Both Hands" – 3:38
 "Talk to Me Now" – 4:29
 "The Slant" – 1:36
 "Work Your Way Out" – 4:08
 "Dog Coffee" – 2:56
 "Lost Woman Song" – 4:50
 "Pale Purple" – 4:02

Side B
 "Rush Hour" – 5:03
 "Fire Door" – 2:42
 "The Story" – 3:30
 "Every Angle" – 2:44
 "Out of Habit" – 2:45
 "Letting the Telephone Ring" – 4:30

Personnel 
 Ani DiFranco – acoustic guitar, vocals

Production 
Ani DiFranco – record producer
Dale Anderson  – producer
 John Caruso – engineer
 Ed Stone – mastering
 Scot Fisher – photography
Dave Meinzer – artwork

References

1990 debut albums
Righteous Babe Records albums
Ani DiFranco albums